Marco Pellegrini (fl. ca. 1500) was a Dominican friar and Vicar-General of the Dominicans in Lombardy from October 1506.  As a novice he took part in the Coppini Mission to England.  He was noted for his opposition to the doctrines of Savonarola and as Vicar-General implemented stern measures to stamp them out in religious houses.

References
Tamar Herzig, Savonarola's women: visions and reform in Renaissance Italy, University of Chicago Press, 2008, p. 136

Year of birth missing
Year of death missing
Italian Dominicans
15th-century births
16th-century deaths